The Wytheville Statesmen were a minor league baseball team located in Wytheville, Virginia. The Statesmen were a member of the Appalachian League.

Affiliations
The Statesmen were affiliated with the following major league teams:

Defunct Appalachian League teams
Baltimore Orioles minor league affiliates
St. Louis Browns minor league affiliates
Defunct baseball teams in Virginia
1953 establishments in Virginia
1954 disestablishments in Virginia
Blue Ridge League teams

References